Shostka is a city in Sumy Oblast, northeastern Ukraine. Shostka serves as the administrative center of Shostka Raion. Population: 

The city lies on the Shostka River, a tributary of the Desna, from which it gets its name. Shostka is an important centre of industry: in chemicals (see Svema) and in dairy, the Shostka City Milk Plant was recently acquired by the Bel Group.

History
In 1739, a gunpowder factory was built there. Since that time Shostka was one of the most important gunpowder suppliers in the Russian Empire. In 1893, a branch of a nearby railroad line was built. Shostka was granted municipal rights in 1920. In 1931, a film factory was built in Shostka which was one of the main suppliers of cinema and photo film in the USSR.

During the 2022 Russian Invasion of Ukraine, Shostka was besieged by Russian troops on February 24. and may have been temporarily occupied.  During the withdrawal from the Chernihiv region and Sumy region, Russian troops left Shostka.

Demographics
Shostka's population: 1926 - 8,600 inhabitants, 1959 - 39,000 inhabitants, 1970 - 64,000 inhabitants, 1979 - 80,000 inhabitants, 1984 - 84,000 inhabitants

Sports
Shostka is home to the Ukrainian football team Impuls Shostka.

The city is the birthplace of Lightweight Boxer Ivan Redkach.

In popular culture
Shostka is the hometown of the fictional Mousekewitz family in the 1986 animated film An American Tail, the opening of which depicts a Cossack (and cat) raid on the town.

Gallery

References

External links
 

Cities in Sumy Oblast
Glukhovsky Uyezd
Cities of regional significance in Ukraine